Astronauts hold a variety of ranks and positions. Each of these roles carries responsibilities that are essential to the operation of a spacecraft. A spacecraft's cockpit, filled with sophisticated equipment, requires skills differing from those used to manage the scientific equipment on board, and so on.

NASA ranks and positions

Ranks 
Members of the NASA Astronaut Corps hold one of two ranks. Astronaut Candidate is the rank of those training to be NASA astronauts.

Upon graduation, candidates are promoted to Astronaut and receive their Astronaut Pin. The pin is issued in two grades, silver and gold, with the silver pin awarded to candidates who have successfully completed astronaut training and the gold pin to astronauts who have flown in space.

Chief of the Astronaut Office is a position, not a rank.

Positions

Roscosmos and Soviet space program ranks and positions

Ranks 
Cosmonauts are professional space travellers from Russia. After initial training, cosmonauts are assigned as either a test-cosmonaut (космонавт-испытатель, kosmonavt-ispytatel') or a research-cosmonaut (космонавт-исследователь, kosmonavt-issledovatel'). A test-cosmonaut has a more difficult preparation than a research-cosmonaut and can be the commander or the flight engineer of a spacecraft, while a research-cosmonaut cannot.

Higher ranks include pilot-cosmonaut, test-cosmonaut instructor, and research-cosmonaut instructor.

Pilot-Cosmonaut of the Russian Federation is a title that is presented to all cosmonauts who fly for the Russian space program.

Positions

China National Space Administration positions

Ranks 
Similarly to NASA, members of the  China National Space Administration (CNSA) hold one of two ranks. Astronaut Candidate is the rank of those training to be CNSA astronauts. The positions of Spacecraft Pilot, Flight Engineer, and Mission Payload Specialist were listed in the announcement for the Group 3 selection.

Upon graduation, candidates are promoted to Astronaut.

Positions

International Space Station positions

See also 
NASA Astronaut Groups – the phases of astronaut selection

References

External links 
Shuttle Commander and Pilot definitions
Shuttle PLC, MS, and PS definitions

Space lists
Ranks
Awards and decorations of NASA